Faces is a 1968 American drama film written and directed by John Cassavetes. It stars John Marley, Gena Rowlands, Lynn Carlin (her acting debut), Seymour Cassel, Fred Draper and Val Avery.

The film won two awards at the 29th Venice International Film Festival and received three nominations at the 41st Academy Awards. In 2011, it was added to the National Film Registry for being "culturally, historically, or aesthetically significant."

Plot
The film, shot in cinéma vérité-style, depicts the final stages of the disintegrating marriage of a couple (John Marley and Lynn Carlin). We are introduced to various groups and individuals the couple interacts with after the husband's sudden statement of his desire for a divorce. Afterwards, he spends the night in the company of brash businessmen and prostitutes, while the wife spends it with her middle-aged female friends and an aging, free-associating playboy they've picked up at a bar. The night proceeds as a series of tense conversations and confrontations occur.

Cast
 John Marley as Richard Forst
 Gena Rowlands as Jeannie Rapp
 Lynn Carlin as Maria Forst
 Fred Draper as Freddie
 Seymour Cassel as Chet
 Val Avery as Jim McCarthy
 Dorothy Gulliver as Florence
 Joanne Moore Jordan as Louise
 Darlene Conley as Billy Mae
 Gene Darfler as Joe Jackson
 Elizabeth Deering as Stella

Production
The film was shot in high-contrast 16 mm black and white film stock. Steven Spielberg worked as an unpaid runner.

Versions
As is the case with several of Cassavetes' films, several different versions of Faces are known to exist (though it was generally assumed that, after creating the general release print, Cassavetes destroyed the alternative versions). It was initially premiered in Toronto with a running time of 183 minutes, before Cassavetes cut it down to 130 minutes. Though the 130-minute version is the general release version, a print of a longer version with a running time of 147 minutes was accidentally found by Ray Carney, and was deposited at the Library of Congress. 17 minutes of this print were included in the Criterion box set John Cassavetes: Five Films, though Carney has said that there are numerous differences between the two films.

Reception
Faces holds an 85% approval rating on review aggregation website Rotten Tomatoes, based on 26 reviews with an average rating of 7.3/10. Roger Ebert gave the film 4 out of 4 stars and wrote that the film "tenderly, honestly, and uncompromisingly examines the way we really live".

Pauline Kael, however, was negative to this film, criticizing the "badly performed" acting and "crudely conceived" scenes.

In 2011, Faces was selected for preservation in the United States National Film Registry by the Library of Congress as being "culturally, historically, or aesthetically significant". The Registry called the film "an example of cinematic excess" whose extended confrontations revealed "emotions and relations of power between men and women that rarely emerge in more conventionally structured films".

Faces, and other Cassavetes projects, had significant creative impact on Martin Scorsese, Woody Allen, and Robert Altman.

Awards and nominations

See also
 List of American films of 1968
 New Hollywood

References

Further reading
Carney, Raymond Francis, Junior, “American Dreaming: The Films of John Cassavetes and the American Experience,” (Berkeley and Los Angeles, California and London: University of California Press, 1985).

External links
 Faces essay by Ray Carney at National Film Registry 

 
 
 Masks and Faces an essay by Stuart Klawans at the Criterion Collection
 Faces review by Richard Brody at The New Yorker

1968 films
1968 drama films
American drama films
American independent films
American black-and-white films
1960s English-language films
Films directed by John Cassavetes
Films shot in Los Angeles
United States National Film Registry films
Films about prostitution in the United States
Adultery in films
1968 independent films
1960s American films